Mladá Boleslav is a city in the Central Bohemian Region of the Czech Republic. It has about 42,000 inhabitants.

Mladá Boleslav is the second most populated city in the region. It is a major centre of the Czech automotive industry thanks to the Škoda Auto company, and therefore the centre of Czech industry as a whole. The historic city centre is well preserved and is protected by law as an urban monument zone.

Administrative parts

Mladá Boleslav is made up of city parts and villages of Mladá Boleslav I (locally called Staré Město, i.e. "Old Town"), Mladá Boleslav II (locally called Nové Město, i.e. "New Town"), Mladá Boleslav III (locally called Podolec), Mladá Boleslav IV (locally called Pták), Bezděčín, Čejetice, Čejetičky, Chrást, Debř, Jemníky, Michalovice, Podchlumí and Podlázky.

Etymology
Mladá Boleslav was named after its founder, Duke Boleslaus II, who was called "The Young One" to distinguish him from his father. Because there was already a town known as Boleslav near Prague, this new town was called Město Boleslava Mladého ("The Town of Boleslav the Young"), later abbreviated to Mladá Boleslav ("Young Boleslav") to distinguish it from the older town of Boleslav, which in the 15th century became known as Stará Boleslav ("Old Boleslav").

Geography
The eastern part of the municipal territory lies in the Jičín Uplands, the western part lies in the Jizera Table. The city is situated on the left bank of the Jizera River, at its confluence with the Klenice River. The historic city centre is situated on a promontory above the confluence.

History

In the second half of the 10th century, a gord was founded by Duke Boleslaus II on a promontory, in the area of today's historic centre. The first trustworthy written mention of the gord is from 1130, when it was also called "New Boleslav" for the first time. Probably in the 11th century, a settlement was founded below the promontory, on an important site on the road from Prague to northern Bohemia, Lusatia, and Brandenburg.

A new stone royal castle was built on top of the promontory next to the gord in the middle of the 13th century, and the gord was abandoned. In 1548 and after a fire in 1555, Renaissance reconstructions were made. In 1600, Mladá Boleslav was promoted to a royal city by Emperor Rudolf II.

In the 16th century, Mladá Boleslav was a leading centre of the Moravian Church, hosting the Brethren's bishop, a Renaissance church, and a printing house. In 1518, the very first map of Bohemia was printed by Mikuláš Klaudyán in Mladá Boleslav. After the Thirty Years' War in the 17th century, the city's population declined by 40% and the castle was in ruins.

At the beginning of the 18th century, the former castle was rebuilt into barracks. During the World War II, it was an internment centre of Jews. Since 1972 the castle serves as the Regional Museum and as the seat of the district archive.

In the 19th century, new prosperity came: the city became an important regional centre as new schools, theatres, museums and factories (including the automobile factory Laurin & Klement, today Škoda Auto) were founded. Since the 1990s, the factory has made it one of the richest and most prosperous Czech cities.

Jewish community
The first written mention of the presence of Jewish community in Mladá Boleslav is from 1471. In 1634, Jacob Bassevi von Treuenberg, the first ennobled Jew in the Habsburg monarchy, was buried in the Jewish cemetery in Mladá Boleslav.

In the 17th and 18th centuries, Mladá Boleslav (called Bumsla by Jews) was an important Jewish centre.

The synagogue was demolished in 1962.

Demographics
The population rapidly increased between 1960 and 1980 because of the rapid growth of production in the Škoda Auto factory and the construction of housing estates for its employees.

Economy

Mladá Boleslav became an industrial centre already in the 19th century. The main factor of its success was its location next to the Jizera River, which was a water source for newly founded factories. The most significant was the textile industry – its largest representative, the Česana factory, had more than 2,000 employees at the end of the 19th century. Another industry in the Jizera valley included mills, breweries, distillery, soaps and perfumes factory, and production of artificial fertilizers. Most of the factories was gradually shut down during the 20th century, mainly due to World War II and politics of the socialist republic.

In 1895, the Laurin & Klement company (the predecessor of Škoda Auto) was founded, and the automotive industry became the main pillar of the city's economy. In 1925, Laurin & Klement was acquired by Škoda works. During the 20th century, many car parts manufacturers were established in the city, including the producer of accumulators for motor vehicles AKUMA (founded in 1903), now part of the FIAMM company.

Since its inception, Škoda Auto is the most important and most influential industrial company in the Czech Republic. As of 2017, the company had 32,000 employees worldwide, out of which 23,000 worked in Mladá Boleslav.

Transport
The D10 motorway passes next to the city.

Mladá Boleslav lies on the railway lines Mladá Boleslav–Turnov, Kolín–Rumburk and Tanvald–Všetaty.

Education

Škoda Auto University is a private university, founded by the company in 2000.

The Secondary Industrial School in Mladá Boleslav was founded in 1867 as one of the very first vocational schools in Czech lands. The development of the school was closely connected with the boom of the Škoda Auto factory. Before the World War II and the first decade after it, the school was the only specialized industrial school in the country.

Sport
The football team FK Mladá Boleslav has played in the Czech First League since 2004. They were runners-up in 2005–06, have been Czech Cup winners twice (2011 and 2016) and have qualified for the European cups for multiple times.

The ice hockey team BK Mladá Boleslav has been playing in the top-tier Czech Extraliga without interruption since 2014.

The city also has one of the Czech top floorball teams, three-time national champions.

Sights

The Renaissance Castle is the main landmark of the city. It houses the Regional Museum with historical, cultural and social history collections.

The Old City Hall in the historic centre is a Renaissance house built in 1554–1559. It is decorated with ornamental and figurative sgraffiti. In the second half of the 19th century and in 1939–1941, the building was reconstructed and other wings were completed. It has two towers, the higher of them was built in 1779 and is open to the public as a lookout tower. The nearby New City Hall was built in the neo-Romanesque style in 1865–1867 and still serves its original purpose.

The Gothic building of Templ Palace comes from 1488–1493. It includes a historic exhibition and also serves cultural purposes.

The history and products of Škoda Auto are exhibited in Škoda Museum. It was opened in the reconstructed premises of the old factory in 1995.

An important architectural monument, protected as a national cultural monument, is the building of the Secondary Industrial School. It was designed by Jiří Kroha in the Functionalist and Constructivist styles, and built in 1923–1927. It is an exceptionally large building, still serving its original purpose. The sculptural decoration of the interiors is also valuable.

Religious monuments

The Church of the Assumption of the Virgin Mary is located next to the Old City Hall and is the main parish church of the city. It has a Gothic core from the mid-15th century. Baroque modifications were made in 1701–1702 and in 1761.

The Church of Saint John of Nepomuk is located on the eastern edge of the historic city centre and form the dominant feature of Míru Square. It was originally a Gothic church from the 14th century, built outside the city gates. It was rebuilt in the Baroque style in 1727.

The Church of Saint Gall is located on a former cemetery, currently converted into a park. It is a Baroque church with a Gothic-Renaissance core. The tower dates from 1735.

The former Church of Saint Bonaventure served as a Benedictine monastery in the mid-14th century, but it is probably much older. A school of Moravian Church was established in the monastery in the 15th–17th centuries. After the Battle of White Mountain, the monastery complex was acquired by the Catholic Church, which rebuilt it in the Baroque style. In 1784–1785, the Piarists established a gymnasium and college here. The church was completely devastated in the 20th century and was only repaired in 2007. Today it is used for social and cultural purposes.

Notable people

Mikuláš Klaudyán (died 1521/1522), scholar
Elijah Landsofer (died 1702), rabbi
Siegfried Kapper (1821–1879), writer
Alfréd Meissner (1871–1950), politician
František Gellner (1881 – c.1914), poet
Frantisek Schubert (1894–1942), chess master
Adina Mandlová (1910–1991), actress
Mila Rechcigl (born 1930), scientist, long-term president of the SVU 
Zdenek Sekanina (born 1936), Czech-American astronomer
Přemysl Sobotka (born 1944), politician
Jan Železný (born 1966), javelin thrower, three-time Olympic winner
Jiri Vlcek (born 1978), Italian rower
Radim Vrbata (born 1981), ice hockey player
Martin Havlát (born 1981), ice hockey player
Marek Schwarz (born 1986), ice hockey player
Radim Šimek (born 1992), ice hockey player
Filip Salač (born 2001), motorcycle rider

Twin towns – sister cities

Mladá Boleslav is twinned with:
 Dieburg, Germany
 Fano, Italy
 Pezinok, Slovakia
 Vantaa, Finland

References

External links

Regional Museum
Youtube-channel about the history of Mladá Boleslav

 
Cities and towns in the Czech Republic
Populated places in Mladá Boleslav District